Ptiliinae is the largest subfamily of feather-winged beetles (family Ptilidae). About 80% of the described genera of these very tiny beetles are contained herein; however, many more genera and species await description.

Like all members of their family, they are usually found in rotting organic material in a wide range of habitats. The clutch generally contains only a single egg, which is very large in comparison to the adult female, sometimes half as long as the beetle itself.

Selected genera

Ptiliidae
Beetle subfamilies